The 2030 Winter Olympics, officially known as the XXVI Olympic Winter Games, is an upcoming international multi-sport event scheduled to take place from 8 to 24 February 2030. The host city  will be likely elected at the 140th IOC Session in Mumbai from 15 to 17 October 2023.

Bidding process
The new IOC bidding process was approved at the 134th IOC Session on 24 June 2019 in Lausanne, Switzerland. The key proposals, driven by the relevant recommendations from Olympic Agenda 2020, are:
Establish a permanent, ongoing dialogue to explore and create interest among cities/regions/countries and National Olympic Committees for any Olympic event
Create two Future Host Commissions (Summer and Winter Games) to oversee interest in future Olympic events and report to the IOC executive board
Give the IOC Session more influence by having non-executive board members form part of the Future Host Commissions.

The IOC also modified the Olympic Charter to increase its flexibility by removing the date of election from 7 years before the games, and changing the host from a single city/region/country to multiple cities, regions, or countries.

Future host winter commissions
The full composition of the winter commissions, overseeing interested hosts or with potential hosts where the IOC may want to create interest, is as follows:

Dialogue stages
According to the Future Host Commission's rules of conduct, the new IOC bidding system is divided into 2 dialogue stages:
Continuous dialogue: Non-committal discussions between the IOC and interested parties (City/Region/Country/NOC interested in hosting) with regard to hosting future Olympic events.
Targeted dialogue: Targeted discussions with one or more interested parties (called preferred host(s)), as instructed by the IOC Executive Board. This follows a recommendation by the Future Host Commission as a result of continuous dialogue.
During the Olympic Summit on 9 December 2022 the IOC informed to remain in "Continuous Dialogue" with several well-developed projects by parties that have expressed interest in the Olympic Winter Games 2030 and with whom intense collaboration is ongoing.

The Summit was also informed that the Commission is looking into challenges and opportunities facing future Olympic Winter Games, such as the impact of climate change. A number of proposals which could have an impact on future elections were discussed, including rotation of the Games within a certain pool of hosts, minimum climate conditions and existing infrastructure criteria.

Upon the request of the Commission, the IOC Executive Board decided to give the Commission more time to study all these factors to make the best possible decisions about future hosting, including a revised 2030 election timeframe.

Bidding parties
The three first potential submitting bidding parties were revealed by Octavian Morariu, the chair of the Future Host Winter Commission, during the 135th IOC Session at the SwissTech Convention Centre in Lausanne, Switzerland in January 2020. He mentioned Salt Lake City of the United States, Sapporo of Japan and a joint bid from the Spanish cities of Barcelona and Zaragoza at the Pyrenees region have conducted feasibility studies. In 2022, Spain withdrew their bid. Vancouver, Canada, made a preliminary bid submission in February 2021.

Stakeholders
Stakeholders are those cities or regions that have expressed potential interest in hosting the Games. To date, five National Olympic Committees have expressed interest, though Spain and Canada later withdrew. The remaining three interested sites are as follows:

  Salt Lake City, Utah, United States; site of the 2002 Olympic Winter Games, the 2002 Paralympic Winter Games and the 2007 Winter Deaflympics. 
In December 2018 the U.S. Olympic & Paralympic Committee named Salt Lake City, Utah as America's Choice for a future Olympic and Paralympic Winter Games. The Salt Lake City-Utah Committee for the Games was formed in February 2020 to pursue a bid for 2030 or 2034. The committee bolstered its engagement with athletes in governance in June 2021, naming four-time Olympic speed skater Catherine Raney-Norman as its chair. In February 2020, following the announcement of Sapporo's bid, the organizing committee for the Salt Lake City bid was considered moving their intention to bid for the 2034 Games as the Summer Games are scheduled for Los Angeles in 2028. At the first meeting in June 2021, the organizing committee considered whether it should change the bid for 2030 or 2034. The decision for Salt Lake City on the bidding for 2030 or 2034 Winter Olympics could be made after Beijing 2022 ending. President and chief executive of the Salt Lake City Bid Committee Fraser Bullock mentioned that the small window between the Los Angeles 2028 and a potential Salt Lake City 2030 Games could be a real difficulty to manage and that the feasibility study for this is still ongoing. The IOC sent a delegation to Salt Lake City, from 27 to 29 April 2022, to conduct an inspection and a technical site visit of the competitions, ceremonies and Olympic Village venues. 
Salt Lake City-Utah Committee for the Games chief executive Fraser Bullock confirmed at a meeting on 1 November 2022 that "SLC considers the upcoming process is focused on 2030 and SLC will fully participate in that process to hopefully get either the 2030 or 2034 Olympics".
  Sapporo, Hokkaido, Japan; host city of the 1972 Winter Olympics, the marathon and race-walking events at the 2020 Summer Olympics and the 1986, 1990 and 2017 Asian Winter Games along the 1991 Winter Universiade. 
In December 2022, Sapporo officials said that that organizers would "discontinue for some time" while investigating the scandal relating to Tokyo 2020, but the bid would not be canceled.

  Stockholm–Åre, Sweden; host city of the 1912 Summer Olympics. 
On 8 February 2023 the Swedish Olympic Committee initiated a feasibility study regarding the Olympics and Paralympics in Sweden in 2030. 
The idea is to review the concept that existed for the candidacy in 2026, which would mean competitions in several places in Sweden, including Stockholm, Falun, Åre and Östersund. An interim report of the feasibility study will be presented on 20 April 2023.

Developments
A decision on the 2030 Winter Olympics host city has been delayed, most likely to 2024, to allow the IOC more time to carefully plan the future of the Winter Olympics. Due to impacts from climate change, the IOC is considering a number of changes to future games, such as rotating host cities, limiting the games to existing or temporary venues, and establishing minimum average temperature requirements. It also considered awarding the 2030 and 2034 winter games simultaneously at the next IOC session, but IOC President Thomas Bach has ruled out that possibility because "it would not be the right thing to do."

Bid details

Potential bids
  Almaty, Kazakhstan
  Borjomi, Georgia
  Calgary, Canada
  Sarajevo, Bosnia and Herzegovina
  Savoie, France
  Trojena, Saudi Arabia

Cancelled bids
  Barcelona and Zaragoza – Pyrenees, SpainOn 21 June 2022, Spain bid withdrew, due to a political row between autonomous communities: Catalonia and Aragon, where the Pyrenees mountain range extends.
  Vancouver, British Columbia, CanadaOn 27th October 2022, the government of the province of British Columbia said that they would not support a bid to host the 2030 Winter Olympics in Vancouver. The government said it would put pressing priorities such as economic conditions and public interest over the Olympics. Vancouver hosted the 2010 Winter Olympics and it would have become the fifth city to host the Winter Olympics twice after St. Moritz, Innsbruck, Lake Placid and Cortina d'Ampezzo. Canada would join Italy and France as having hosted three Winter Olympics and one Summer Olympic Games had the bid succeeded.
  Chamonix, France -  Valais, Switzerland -  Aosta, ItalyOn 4 January 2023 Swiss newspaper Le Temps reported that a bid is being prepared centred around Espace Mont-Blanc, a cross-border initiative in which several Alpine regions, including Valais, Chamonix and the Aosta Valley. However the next day Éric Fournier, Mayor of Chamonix-Mont-Blanc, indicated that "the project of a cross-border candidacy for Olympic Games as relayed by certain media is not on the agenda", and that there is public opposition to the bid.  Chamonix hosted the first Winter Olympic Games in 1924, while Sion and Aosta made failed bids for the Winter Olympics.

Broadcasting rights
Albania – RTSH
Australia – Nine Network
Austria – ORF
Belgium – RTBF, VRT
Brazil – Grupo Globo
Bulgaria – BNT
Canada – CBC/Radio-Canada
China – CMG
Croatia – HRT
Czech Republic – ČT
Denmark – DR, TV 2
Europe (except Russia and Belarus) – EBU, Warner Bros. Discovery
Estonia – ERR
Finland – Yle
France – France Télévisions
Germany – ARD, ZDF
Greece – ERT
Hungary – MTVA
Iceland – RÚV
Ireland – RTÉ
Israel – Sports Channel
Italy – RAI
Japan – Japan Consortium
Latvia – LTV
Lithuania – LRT
Montenegro – RTCG
Netherlands – NOS
Norway – NRK
Poland – TVP
Slovakia – RTVS
Slovenia – RTV
Korea – JTBC
Spain – RTVE
Sweden – SVT
Switzerland – SRG SSR
Ukraine – Suspilne
United Kingdom – BBC
United States – NBCUniversal

References

 
Winter Olympics
Winter Olympics by year
Winter Olympics